Mandawar may refer to any of the following towns in India:

 Mandawar, Uttar Pradesh
 Mandawar, Rajasthan

See also
 Mundawar